William O. Douglas Award could refer to:

William O. Douglas Award (WACDL) given by the Washington Association of Criminal Defense Lawyers
William O. Douglas Award (ASECA) given by the Association of Securities and Exchange Commission Alumni
William O. Douglas Award (C&OCA) given by the C&O Canal Association 
William O. Douglas Award (Sierra) given by the Sierra Club

See also
William O. Douglas Prize given by the Commission on Freedom of Expression